ZTL may refer to:
 Honorifics for the dead in Judaism
 L class blimp
 Atlanta Air Route Traffic Control Center, abbreviated ZTL
 Zero Torsional Load, a motorcycle braking technology developed by Buell Motorcycle Company
 Zona a traffico limitato, a term used in Italy for zones in a town or city centre where access by motor vehicles is restricted.